Ilex is the genus of flowering plants also known as holly.

Ilex or ILEX may also refer to:

Biology
 Centrolene ilex, a South American frog
 Quercus ilex (the holm or holly oak), a Mediterranean tree

Enterprises and organizations
 ILEX Press Ltd., division of Hachette publishing books on graphics
 Ilex Theatre Company at Hollyfield School, Surrey, England
 Ilex Urban Regeneration Company Ltd., an urban regeneration company set up by the Northern Ireland Executive
 International Legal Exchange Program (or ILEX), a student exchange program for law students
 Institute of Legal Executives (or ILEX), a professional (and examination) body in England & Wales
 Intelligent Labelling Explorer (or ILEX), an artificial intelligence project at the University of Edinburgh, Scotland

Other uses
 HMS Ilex (D61), a British Royal Navy I-class destroyer that served during World War II